Auburn is a city in south-central Maine within the United States. The city serves as the county seat of Androscoggin County. The population was 24,061 at the 2020 census. Auburn and its sister city Lewiston are known locally as the Twin Cities or Lewiston–Auburn (L–A).

History
The area was originally part of the Pejepscot Purchase, land bought in 1714 by an association of people from Boston and Portsmouth following the Treaty of Portsmouth, which brought peace between the Abenaki Indians and the settlers of present-day Maine. In 1736, however, the Massachusetts General Court granted a large section of the land to veterans of the 1690 Battle of Quebec. Conflicting claims led to prolonged litigation; consequently, settlement was delayed until after the French and Indian Wars.

Auburn was first settled in 1786 as part of Bakerstown, renamed Poland when it was incorporated by the Massachusetts General Court in 1795. It was then part of Minot, formed from parts of Poland and incorporated in 1802. Auburn would itself be formed from parts of Minot and incorporated on February 24, 1842. The name was apparently inspired by "Auburn", a village (real or fictitious) featured in the 1770 poem "The Deserted Village" by Oliver Goldsmith. Originally part of Cumberland County, the town became county seat of Androscoggin County at its creation in 1854. By annexing land from towns around it, including part of Poland in 1852, Minot in 1873, and all of Danville (first called Pejepscot) in 1867, Auburn grew geographically into one of Maine's largest municipalities. Incorporated a city on February 22, 1869, Auburn in 1917 would be the first city in the state to adopt a council-manager form of government.

Farms supplied grain and produce, but with construction of the bridge across the river to Lewiston in 1823, and especially after arrival of the Atlantic and St. Lawrence Railroad from Portland in January 1848, the community developed into a mill town. Mills were built to operate by water power from falls on the Androscoggin River and Little Androscoggin River. In 1835, the factory system of shoe manufacture originated at Auburn. Other firms manufactured cotton and woolen textiles, carriages, iron goods, bricks and furniture. The population in 1860 was only about 4,000 but by 1890 it was about 12,000, when its shoe factories attracted many French Canadian immigrants, many of whom arrived by train from Quebec. Steady population growth continued to about 1960 when the population was about 24,500.

In Auburn, shoe manufacturing became the dominant industry by the late 19th century. The City Seal, depicting a spindle with different types of shoes at each outside point, was designed when Auburn was positioning itself as the shoe manufacturing center of Maine in the mid-19th century. In 1917 one factory in Auburn was producing 75 percent of the world's supply of white canvas shoes; however, after World War II the shoe industry began to decline, and between 1957 and 1961 the largest manufacturers closed their factories.

The area became noted in 1985 due to the plane crash that took the life of Samantha Smith.

Lewiston-Auburn Shoe Strike

In 1937, one of the largest labor disputes in Maine history occurred in Lewiston and Auburn. The Lewiston-Auburn Shoe Strike lasted from March to June and at its peak involved 4,000 to 5,000 workers on strike. After workers attempted to march across the Androscoggin River from Lewiston to Auburn, Governor Lewis Barrows sent in the Maine Army National Guard. Some labor leaders, CIO Secretary Powers Hapgood, were imprisoned for months after a Maine Supreme Judicial Court judge issued an injunction seeking to end the strike.

Geography
Auburn is located at  (44.089, −70.241). Auburn is drained by the Little Androscoggin River and Androscoggin River.

Demographics

Auburn is one of two principal cities of and included in the Lewiston-Auburn, Maine metropolitan New England city and town area and the Lewiston-Auburn, Maine Metropolitan Statistical Area (which is part of the Portland-Lewiston-South Portland, Maine combined statistical area).

2010 census
As of the census of 2010, there were 23,055 people, 9,974 households, and 5,818 families living in the city. The racial makeup of the city was 93.7% White, 2.5% African American, 0.4% Native American, 0.9% Asian, 0.3% from other races, and 2.1% from two or more races. Hispanic or Latino of any race were 1.5% of the population.

There were 9,974 households, of which 29.1% had children under the age of 18 living with them, 39.9% were married couples living together, 13.0% had a female householder with no husband present, 5.4% had a male householder with no wife present, and 41.7% were non-families. 32.0% of all households were made up of individuals, and 12.8% had someone living alone who was 65 years of age or older. The average household size was 2.26 and the average family size was 2.84.

The median age in the city was 39.9 years. 22.1% of residents were under the age of 18; 8.6% were between the ages of 18 and 24; 26.1% were from 25 to 44; 27.9% were from 45 to 64; and 15.2% were 65 years of age or older. The gender makeup of the city was 48.3% male and 51.7% female.

2000 census
As of the census of 2000, there were 23,203 people, 9,764 households, and 5,907 families living in the city. The racial makeup of the city was 97.04% White, 0.59% African American, 0.30% Native American, 0.59% Asian, 0.05% Pacific Islander, 0.10% from other races, and 1.32% from two or more races. Hispanic or Latino of any race were 0.73% of the population.

There were 9,764 households, out of which 29.4% had children under the age of 18 living with them, 44.9% were married couples living together, 11.6% had a female householder with no husband present, and 39.5% were non-families. 32.0% of all households were made up of individuals, and 13.2% had someone living alone who was 65 years of age or older. The average household size was 2.28 and the average family size was 2.88.

In the city, the population was spread out, with 23.2% under the age of 18, 8.1% from 18 to 24, 29.3% from 25 to 44, 22.2% from 45 to 64, and 17.1% who were 65 years of age or older. The median age was 38 years. For every 100 females, there were 90.5 males. For every 100 females age 18 and over, there were 86.9 males.

The median income for a six households in the city was $35,652, and the median income for a family was $44,012. Males had a median income of $32,088 versus $22,349 for females. The per capita income for the city was $19,942. About 9.0% of families and 12.0% of the population were below the poverty line, including 16.6% of those under age 18 and 11.8% of those age 65 or over.

Voter registration

Government
Auburn is in Maine's 2nd congressional district, Maine Senate District 20, and Maine House of Representatives Districts 68, 69, and 70.

Due to Auburn's relatively expansive land area, the city is divided up into five wards. The city's governing body is a City Council, consisting of a mayor and 7 councilmembers (one from each of the five wards, and two elected at large). The mayor is elected at large.

Auburn's current Mayor is Jason J. Levesque. The last mayor was Jonathan LaBonte. He was the youngest mayor in the city's history. John Jenkins is a former mayor and state senator from Auburn.

Education
Public primary and secondary education is provided by the Auburn School Department, including Edward Little High School.

In addition, there are the following schools in the city:
 St. Dominic Regional High School, a Catholic high school
 Central Maine Community College, community college

Media

Newspapers
 The Sun Journal prints a daily newspaper in two different editions statewide. The Sun Journal was the recipient of the 2008 New England Daily Newspaper of the Year and the 2009 Maine Press Association Newspaper of the Year.

Transportation

Roads
Interstate 95
US Route 202
State Route 11
State Route 4
State Route 121
State Route 136
State Route 122

By air
Auburn is the home of the Auburn-Lewiston Municipal Airport, located off Hotel Road.

Rail
Two freight railroads pass through the city. Pan Am Railways (formerly Springfield Terminal Railway and Maine Central Railroad) is the primary rail connection for the city. Pan Am's main line from Rotterdam Junction, New York to Northern Maine Junction, Maine closely parallels US Route 202 through much of Auburn. The St. Lawrence and Atlantic Railroad's main line from Portland to Montreal also runs through the southwestern section of the city, passing near the Auburn/Lewiston Municipal Airport; at Lewiston Junction, a branch leased from the Lewiston and Auburn Railroad runs northwest through Auburn. The branch formerly crossed the Androscoggin River into Lewiston.

Sites of interest

 Androscoggin Historical Society & Museum—artifacts of local history, Civil War memorabilia, farming tools and a bird collection
 Auburn Fire Department Museum—a collection of antique fire equipment from the city
 Festival Plaza, completed in 2002—public park and performance space along the Androscoggin River. Two public water sculptures designed by artist Ross Miller operate seasonally – the Falls Fountain, that references the Androscoggin River and Native American legends of being able to hide behind the falls; and the Shoe Fountain, a series of cast bronze shoes recalling the early shoe manufacturing history of the area. A map of the Androscoggin River is cast into the plaza with colored concrete.
 Good Shepherd Food Bank distributes food to agencies across the state from its main warehouse in Auburn
 Hamster Point—Majestic river side gardens
 Knight House Museum (1796) – the oldest frame house downtown, with a pre-1835 handwork shoe shop
 Auburn Mall

National Register of Historic Places

 A. A. Garcelon House (1890)
 Androscoggin County Courthouse and Jail (1857)
 Auburn Public Library (1903)
 Barker Mill (1873)
 Charles A. Jordan House (1880)
 Charles L. Cushman House (1889)
 Edward Little House (1827)
 Engine House (1879)
 First Universalist Church (1876)
 Frank L. Dingley House (1867)
 Free Baptist Church
 Gay-Munroe House (1878)
 Holman Day House (1895)
 Horace Munroe House (1899)
 Horatio G. Foss House (1914)
 Lamoreau Site
 Main Street Historic District
 Roak Block (1871)
 William A. Robinson House (1874)
 William Briggs Homestead (1797)

Notable people 

 Tony Atlas, wrestler
 John Bower, skier
 Lenny Breau, jazz guitarist
 Erwin Canham, American journalist and author
 Alonzo Conant, judge, Auburn Municipal Court (1946–1958)
 Aaron S. Daggett, last surviving Civil War general
 T. A. D. Fessenden, U.S. congressman
 Sara Mae Stinchfield Hawk, speech pathologist
 John Jenkins, mayor
 Edward Little, philanthropist, educator
 Robert Luce, U.S. congressman
 Cynthia McFadden, correspondent for ABC News
 Dana T. Merrill, U.S. Army brigadier general
 Elmer Drew Merrill, botanist
 George Perkins Merrill, geologist
 Julie M. J. Parisien, skier
 Deborah Simpson, state legislator
 Billy Silverman, referee
 Charles Small, center fielder with the Boston Red Sox
 Olympia Snowe, U.S. senator and congresswoman
 Peter T. Snowe, Maine state legislator
 John H. Sturgis, Maine state legislator

References

External links

 City of Auburn, Maine
 Auburn Public Library
 Androscoggin County Chamber of Commerce
 Three Auburn women: 100 years of friendship 1919 to 2019 NPR, December 22, 2019

 
Cities in Maine
County seats in Maine
Populated places established in 1786
Cities in Androscoggin County, Maine
Portland metropolitan area, Maine